2E6 may refer to:

EIA Class 2 dielectric
2E6 group in mathematics